The 2014–15 Hamburger SV season was the 127th season in the club's football history. In 2014–15, the club played in the Bundesliga, the top tier of German football. It was the club's 52nd consecutive season in this league, being the only club to have played every season in the Bundesliga since its introduction in 1963.

First team squad

As of March 2015, according to the official website.

Out on loan

Transfers

In

Out

Competitions

Bundesliga

League table

Results summary

Results by round

Matches

Relegation play-offs

DFB-Pokal

References

Hamburger SV seasons
Hamburger SV season 2014-15